Enrico Biscotti Company is a bakery and restaurant in Pittsburgh. The main location is in the Strip District neighborhood. The main product is biscotti. It was featured in the film The Bread, My Sweet, a film by the then-wife of owner Larry Lagattuta and also on Food Network.

Lagattuta founded Enrico Biscotti bakery, featuring bread and biscotti, in 1993.  He had previously been an account executive with Lucent Technologies.  A few years later, the offerings were expanded to include pizzas and cappuccino.  Owner Lagattuta offers an occasional class in bread baking.

In 2003, a second location was opened in Shadyside neighborhood.  Unlike the original bakery/cafe, the Shadyside location is more of a restaurant.

In 2010, a third location opened in Highland Park neighborhood.  The unintentional grand opening occurred during the February 9–10, 2010, North American blizzard, with the cafe serving as a soup kitchen for the snowed-in neighbors.

Gallery

References

Bakeries of the United States
Companies based in Pittsburgh
Culture of Pittsburgh
Restaurants established in 1993